Jan Öhman (born 4 July 1942 in Stockholm, Sweden) is a Swedish former footballer. He played for AIK, Hagalunds IS, Djurgårdens IF, St. Louis Stars, and IK Sirius.

Career
Öhman played with St. Louis Stars during the 1968 season and made seven appearances (0 goals).

Honours

Club 

 Djurgårdens IF 
 Allsvenskan (1): 1966

References

Swedish footballers
Swedish expatriate footballers
AIK Fotboll players
Djurgårdens IF Fotboll players
St. Louis Stars (soccer) players
IK Sirius Fotboll players
Allsvenskan players
North American Soccer League (1968–1984) players
Expatriate soccer players in the United States
Swedish expatriate sportspeople in the United States
1942 births
Living people
Association football wingers
Footballers from Stockholm